The United States national cricket team is the team that represents the United States in international cricket. The team was formerly organized by the United States of America Cricket Association (USACA), which became an associate member of the International Cricket Council (ICC) in 1965. In June 2017, the USACA was expelled by the ICC due to governance and financing issues, with the U.S. team being temporarily overseen by ICC Americas until a new sanctioning body was established. In January 2019, associate membership was officially granted to USA Cricket.

A U.S. representative team participated in the first international cricket match, played against Canada in 1844. For a century and a half, the U.S. national team seldom played against other national teams. It played mostly against Canada (in the annual Auty Cup), or against visiting teams from other countries.

The United States made its international tournament debut at the 1979 ICC Trophy in England; it has since missed only two editions of the tournament (now known as the World Cup Qualifier).  After winning the 2004 ICC Six Nations Challenge, the team qualified for the 2004 ICC Champions Trophy, playing its first two One Day International (ODI) matches. In April 2018, the ICC decided to grant full Twenty20 International (T20I) status to all its members. Therefore, all Twenty20 matches played between the United States and other ICC members after January 1, 2019, are a full T20I. The first ever T20I to be played by the United States was scheduled against the United Arab Emirates in March 2019.

In the World Cricket League, the US finished fourth in the 2019 Division Two tournament, losing a third place playoff to Papua New Guinea, a match which was designated as an ODI (and thus became the United States' third-ever ODI match, 15 years after their last). This fourth-place finish was sufficient to earn the country a place in 2019–22 ICC Cricket World Cup League 2, in which all the team's matches would carry ODI status. The team's first domestic ODI series began on September 13, 2019, hosting Papua New Guinea and Namibia.

History

Beginnings

The British brought cricket to the Thirteen Colonies in the early 18th century. Cricket further grew in the 18th century. It is understood from anecdotal evidence that George Washington was a strong supporter of cricket, participating on at least one occasion in a game of wicket with his troops at Valley Forge during the American Revolution. John Adams was recorded as saying in Congress that if leaders of cricket clubs could be called "presidents", there was no reason why the leader of the new nation could not be called the same.

In 1844, the United States participated in the first international cricket match. This was played against Canada at the St George's Cricket Club Ground, Bloomingdale Park, New York. This first international sporting event was attended by 20,000 people and established the longest international sporting rivalry in the modern era. Wagers of around $120,000 were placed on the outcome of the match. This is equivalent to around $1.5 million in 2007.

Sides from England toured North America (taking in both the US and Canada) following the English cricket seasons of 1859, 1868 and 1872. These were organized as purely commercial ventures. Most of the matches of these early touring teams were played "against odds", that is to say the home team was permitted to have more than eleven players (usually twenty-two) in order to make a more even contest.

Decline
In spite of cricket's popularity in the 18th and early 19th centuries, the game was supplanted by baseball in the 1850s and 1860s. As interest in baseball rose, the rules of that game were changed slightly to increase its popularity. For example, easily manufactured round bats were introduced to contrast the flat bats of cricket.

Another reason for cricket's decline in popularity may be that in the late 19th century American cricket remained an amateur sport reserved for the wealthy while England and Australia were developing a professional version of the game. As cricket standards improved with professionalism elsewhere in the world many North American cricket clubs stayed stubbornly elitist. Clubs such as Philadelphia CC and Merion abandoned cricket and converted their facilities to other sports. Some city cricket clubs unknowingly contributed to their own demise by sponsoring auxiliary baseball teams.

By 1900, baseball was dominant numerically and culturally in the US. In addition, when the first international body for the sport, the Imperial Cricket Conference (ICC) was formed in 1909, membership was restricted to countries in the British Empire. This undercut the popularity of cricket outside the empire and reduced momentum to professionalize cricket in the US. Whether a more open ICC would have maintained or increased the momentum remains an open question, however. Regardless of its cause, the game did not flourish in the United States the way it did in the British Empire. From the 1880s until the outbreak of World War I, cricket in the US was dominated not by a truly national team, but by the amateur Philadelphia cricket team, which was selected from clubs in cricket's American stronghold – the Philadelphia metropolitan area.

A tour of North America by the Australians in 1913 saw two first-class games (both won by the tourists) against a combined Canada–USA team.

Philadelphian cricket

The Philadelphian cricket team was a team that represented Philadelphia in first-class cricket between 1878 and 1913. Even though the United States had played the first ever international cricket match against Canada in 1844, the sport began a slow decline in the country. This decline was furthered by the rise in popularity of baseball. In Philadelphia, however, the sport remained very popular and from the end of the 19th century until the outbreak of World War I, the city produced a first class team that rivaled many others in the world. The team was composed of players from the four chief cricket clubs in Philadelphia–Germantown, Merion, Belmont, and Philadelphia. Players from smaller clubs, such as Tioga and Moorestown, and local colleges, such as Haverford and Penn, also played for the Philadelphians. Over its 35 years, the team played in 89 first-class cricket matches. Of those, 29 were won, 46 were lost, 13 were drawn and one game was abandoned before completion.

Arguably, the greatest American cricketer ever played for Philadelphia during this period. John Barton King was a very skilled batsman, but really proved his worth as a bowler. During his career, he set numerous records in North America and at least one first-class bowling record. He competed with and succeeded against the best cricketers in the world from England and Australia. King was the dominant bowler on his team when it toured England in 1897, 1903, and 1908. He dismissed batsmen with his unique delivery, which he called "the angler", and helped to perfect swing bowling in the sport. Many of the great bowlers of today still use the strategies and techniques that he developed. Sir Pelham Warner described Bart King as one of the finest bowlers of all time, and Donald Bradman called him "America's greatest cricketing son."

On June 28, 1913, the Philadelphians played the last first-class game on the mainland for more than 90 years. Games were played in the US Virgin Islands in the interim, which is considered as part of the West Indies by the ICC. The team had played an American national side 6 times between 1885 and 1894. The United States team won one of these matches, lost two, and earned a draw in three. Cricket remained a minor pastime in the United States until the mid-1960s, when ICC reforms allowed associate members to join.

Status from 1965
In 1965, Clifford Severn made his USA debut at 39, alongside his young brother Winston, in a two-day match against Canada at Calgary's Riley Park as part of the longest running international rivalry in international cricket, now known as the Auty Cup. A year later in the return contest at the C. Aubrey Smith field in Los Angeles, USA won by 54 runs.

In 1965, the Imperial Cricket Conference changed its name to the International Cricket Conference. In addition, new rules were adopted to permit the election of countries from outside the Commonwealth. This led to the expansion of the Conference, with the admission of Associate Members, including the United States. Today cricket is played in all fifty states.

The USA have played in every edition of the ICC Trophy, though they didn't pass the first round until the 1990 tournament in the Netherlands. They reached the plate final of the 1994 tournament, but opted not to play due to prior travel arrangements. They finished twelfth in 1997.

21st century

2000–09

USA finished sixth in the 2001 ICC Trophy, their best performance to date. They have also played in every edition of the ICC Americas Championship, winning in 2002.

In 2004, the United States cricket team played a first-class match as part of the first ICC Intercontinental Cup. The matches against Canada and Bermuda were the first in many years. The team won the ICC 6 Nations Challenge beating Scotland, Namibia, the Netherlands, and the UAE on net run rate by 0.028 of a run.

Winning the ICC Six Nations meant that they qualified for the ICC Champions Trophy 2004 in England. Here the USA played their first ever One Day International match against New Zealand at The Oval on September 10, 2004.

The US side was beaten by New Zealand and lost to Australia in the tournament, as well.

The 2005 ICC Trophy represented a chance for the US to re-establish themselves on the world stage and qualify for the 2007 World Cup. A poor showing saw them finish at the bottom of their group, with four losses and a match abandoned due to rain from their five group fixtures. This failure robbed the USA of the prize of full One Day International status on offer to the World Cup qualifiers. This failure was compounded on August 9, 2005, when the ICC removed the US from the 2005 ICC Intercontinental Cup after legal disputes prevented them from naming a squad.

The United States made their return to international cricket in August 2006 when they participated in Division One of the ICC Americas Championship in Canada. They finished second in the five team tournament.

In 2007 the United States were to visit Darwin, Australia to take part in Division Three of the ICC World Cricket League. A top two finish in this tournament would have qualified them for Division Two of the same tournament later in the year. However, amid internal disputes over the constitution of the USACA, the team was forced to withdraw after the ICC suspended the USACA in March 2007. The dispute was resolved in early 2008, and the suspension was lifted on April 1 of that year.

The team's reinstatement permitted them to enter the World Cricket League in Division Five for 2008 in Jersey.  The team made it through the Group Stage tied for first in their division with a 4–0–0 record (one match abandoned), but lost both their semi-final match with Jersey and their third-place play-off with Nepal.

2010–2015

USA finished second in the 2010 Division Five after losing the final against Nepal and won promotion to 2010 Division Four. They continued their climb in more emphatic style by finishing first in 2010 Division Four, demolishing Italy in the final. They were promoted to 2011 Division Three where they took last place and were relegated to 2012 Division Four. There they finished in second place, and were promoted back to 2013 Division Three. They remained in Division Three after finishing in third place, but were relegated after finishing fifth in 2014 Division Three.

2015 suspension

On June 26, 2015, the ICC again suspended USACA, this time because an ICC review "had expressed significant concerns about the governance, finance, reputation and cricketing activities of USACA". This suspension does not impact the National Team playing Matches, but instead cuts off ICC funding and stops USACA from being able to approve any events held in the USA (although the ICC can still approve events held in the United States). This suspension will be upheld until USACA can show the ICC that "conditions relating to governance, finance and its cricket activities" have improved.

In the 2016 Division Four the USA finished second, with a 3–2 record and was promoted to 2017 Division Three.  In the 2017 Division Three competition, the USA finished fourth, with a 2–3 record.  The third place match was rained out and finished with no result.  The USA remained in Division Three.

2017–present: Transition to USA Cricket, Cricket World Cup League 2

On June 22, 2017, at the ICC Annual Conference in London, the ICC Full Council voted unanimously to expel the USACA, following a Board recommendation in April, and a recent Dispute Resolution Committee hearing before Michael Beloff, which concluded in June 2017. This included its refusal to ratify an ICC-approved constitution. In January 2019, a new sanctioning body known as USA Cricket was officially admitted by the ICC as a new associate member.

After beating Singapore in the final match of the 2018 ICC World Cricket League Division Three, the United States were promoted to the Division Two for the first time. In April 2019, after finishing in the top 4 of the 2019 Division Two tournament, the United States qualified for the 2019–22 ICC Cricket World Cup League 2—which offers an opportunity to advance to the 2022 Cricket World Cup Qualifier. All matches in the Cricket World Cup League 2 are played in the One Day International format.

As of 2019, all ICC members were granted Twenty20 International (T20I) status. The United States made its T20I debut on March 15, 2019, against the United Arab Emirates at the ICC Academy Ground in Dubai.

In November 2021, Ireland announced that it would play a five-match limited overs series against the United States in December 2021, leading into its ODI series against the West Indies in January 2022. This marked the first time that the United States had ever hosted a bilateral series with a Test nation. The series began with two T20Is; after a slow start, a high-scoring partnership of Sushant Modani and Gajanand Singh bolstered the team during the second half of its innings, contributing to a total haul of 188 runs. With Ireland falling short by 26 runs, the United States achieved its first-ever victory in an international match against a Test nation.

Ireland split the T20I series in the second match; batting first, the team was bowled out at 150, but the United States fell short in their innings by nine runs. The series was expected to continue on with ODI matches. However, on December 28, 2021, the entirety of the ODI series was cancelled after multiple postponements due to COVID-19 issues.

Tournament history

ICC T20 World Cup

ICC Champions Trophy
1998–2002: Did not participate
2004: First round
2006: Did not qualify

ICC Intercontinental Cup
2004: First round
2005: Originally due to take part but replaced by Cayman Islands due to suspension
2006/07: Did not participate
2007/08: Did not participate

World Cricket League
2007: Originally set to take part in Division Three but relegated due to suspension
2008 Division Five: 4th place
2010 Division Five: 2nd place
2010 Division Four: Champions
2011 Division Three: 6th place
2012 Division Four: 2nd place
2013 Division Three: 3rd place
2014 Division Three: 5th place
2016 Division Four: 1st place
2017 Division Three: 4th place
2018 Division Three: 2nd place
2019 Division Two: 4th place

ICC Trophy
1979–1986: First round
1990: Second round
1994: Plate competition.
1997: 12th place
2001: 6th place
2005: 10th place

ICC Americas Championship
2000: 3rd place
2002: Won
2004: Runners up
2006: Division One Runners up
2008: Won
2010: Runners up
2011: Runners up

ICC Twenty20 Americas Championship
2010 Division One: Won
2011 Division One: 2nd place
2013 Division One: Won
2015 Division One: 2nd place

Stadiums 
The only U.S. cricket stadiums to meet international standards and have ODI status are the Central Broward Regional Park in Lauderhill, Florida, and Moosa Stadium in Pearland, Texas. Other established U.S. facilities include Church Street Park in Morrisville, North Carolina; the Prairie View Cricket Complex in Houston, Texas; and the Leo Magnus Cricket Complex in Los Angeles, California. The AirHogs Stadium, in which a lease was acquired for, is also currently under construction to build a world-class cricket stadium.

Coaching staff

Coaching history
2012-2014:  Robin Singh
2015-2016:  Nasir Javed
2016-2019:  Pubudu Dassanayake
2019-2020:  James Pamment (interim)
2020-2022:  J. Arunkumar
2023–present:  Kevin Darlington (interim)

Current squad
This lists all the active players who have been selected in the team's most recent squad. Updated as on 17 August 2022.

Key
S/N = Shirt number
C/G = Contract grade

Captains

Eight players have represented the United States as captain. The first American captain was Anil Kashkari, who was reprised of his role in 1979.

Richard Staple was the first American captain to captain the side in a One Day International (ODI), which occurred in 2004. After Staple retired in 2005, Steve Massiah took over his role as captain. However, Sushil Nadkarni captained the American side during the 2012 ICC World Twenty20 Qualifier.

In October 2013, Neil McGarrell was named USA's captain in a 15-man squad for the 2013 ICC World Twenty20 Qualifier in the UAE. McGarrell had played four Tests and 17 ODIs for West Indies between 1998 and 2001. He made his debut for USA in 2012 against Canada and takes over from Steve Massiah who had captained for seven years.

In October 2018, Saurabh Netravalkar took over as captain of the team, after Ibrahim Khaleel was sacked. Khaleel was elected captain in 2017 and under his captainship USA won Auty Cup after a long gap.

In October 2021, Monank Patel took over as T20I and ODI captain from Saurabh Netravalkar.

ICC Cricket World Cup League 2 Fixtures
In May 2019, the ICC announced the following schedule of Tri-Series involving The United States cricket team, as part of the 2019–22 ICC Cricket World Cup League 2. Each Tri-Series will have four scheduled One Day International matches for each team. This guarantees at least 36 scheduled ODI for each team before January 2022.

Records
International Match Summary – United States

Last updated 26 November 2022

One Day Internationals
Highest team total: 323/8 v. Oman on 8 June 2022 at Moosa Stadium, Pearland.
Highest individual score: 173*, Jaskaran Malhotra v. Papua New Guinea on 9 September 2021 at Al Amerat Cricket Stadium, Muscat.
Best innings bowling: 5/20, Ali Khan v. Oman on 8 June 2022 at Moosa Stadium, Pearland.

Most ODI runs for United States

Most ODI wickets for United States

ODI record versus other nations

Records complete to ODI #4486. Last updated 26 November 2022.

Twenty20 Internationals
Highest team total: 201/6 v. Singapore on 12 July 2022 at Bulawayo Athletic Club, Bulawayo.
Highest individual score: 101*, Steven Taylor v. Jersey on 11 July 2022 at Bulawayo Athletic Club, Bulawayo.
Best innings bowling: 5/12, Saurabh Netravalkar v. Singapore on 12 July 2022 at Bulawayo Athletic Club, Bulawayo.

Most T20I runs for United States

Most T20I wickets for United States

T20I record versus other nations

Records complete to T20I #1667. Last updated 17 July 2022.

See also
 Cricket in the United States
 List of United States ODI cricketers
 List of United States Twenty20 International cricketers
 Major League Cricket
 Minor League Cricket
 Pro Cricket
 United States national under-19 cricket team

Notes

References

External links
USACA website
Cricinfo USA

Cricket in the United States
National cricket teams
Cricket
United States in international cricket